Tomstown is an unincorporated community in Quincy Township in southeastern Franklin County, in the U.S. state of Pennsylvania.

History
A post office called Tomstown was established in 1892, and remained in operation until 1901. The community was named after John Toms, a first settler. A variant name is "Toms Town".

References

Unincorporated communities in Franklin County, Pennsylvania
Unincorporated communities in Pennsylvania